"Everywhere but On" is a song recorded by American country music singer Matt Stell. It is the second single from his 2019 EP Everywhere but On.

Content
Stell wrote the song with Lance Miller and Paul Sikes. The song is about a man who is attempting to get through a breakup; according to Stell, he was going through a breakup while writing the song. According to Stell, the idea came when Sikes presented the title lyric "I've moved everywhere but on", after which the three writers decided to build around the title lyric. Stell describes the song as "super personal" because he included details from his own relationship in it. People described the song as "express[ing] how difficult it is to move on".

Chart performance

Weekly charts

Year-end charts

Certifications

References

2019 songs
2020 singles
Arista Nashville singles
Matt Stell songs
Songs written by Lance Miller
Songs written by Paul Sikes